James Lysaght Finegan or Finigan (1844–8 September 1900) was an Irish barrister, soldier, merchant and politician. 
He was educated by the Congregation of Christian Brothers and described as an "Anti-clericalist", and with his family engaged in the tea trade, while supporting the Nationalist cause. In 1867 a nationalist called Michael Breslin was forced to leave Ireland, and only avoided arrest thanks to documents given to him by Finegan certifying him as a tea trader.

Finegan later served in the French Foreign Legion during the Franco-Prussian War, leaving in 1871 at the conclusion of the war. In the 1879 by-election in Ennis  he was proposed as an alternative candidate to that of the Home Rule League by Charles Stewart Parnell; he won by only six votes, out of 247 electors. His service in parliament was brief; he resigned in 1882.

References

External links 
 

1900 deaths
19th-century Irish people
Members of the Parliament of the United Kingdom for County Clare constituencies (1801–1922)
Soldiers of the French Foreign Legion
UK MPs 1874–1880
UK MPs 1880–1885
Irish expatriates in France
Barristers from Northern Ireland
Military personnel of the Franco-Prussian War
Irish soldiers in the French Army
1844 births